Jon Stanley McLachlan (born 23 June 1949) is a former New Zealand rugby union player. A wing, McLachlan represented Auckland at a provincial level, and was a member of the New Zealand national side, the All Blacks, on their 1974 tour of Australia and Fiji. He played eight matches for the All Blacks including one international.

References

1949 births
Living people
Rugby union players from Auckland
New Zealand rugby union players
New Zealand international rugby union players
Auckland rugby union players
Rugby union wings